Bydgoszcz Voivodeship was a unit of administrative division and local government in Poland in the years 1975–1998, superseded by Kuyavian-Pomeranian Voivodeship.
 Capital city: Bydgoszcz
 Area: 
 Statistics (1 January 1992):
 Population:  inhabitants 
 Population density: inhabitants/km2
 Administrative division:  communes
 Number of cities and towns (urban communes): 

 Major cities and towns (population 1995): 
 Bydgoszcz (385,800)
 Inowrocław (79,400)
 Chojnice (39,800)
 Świecie (27,000)
 Nakło nad Notecią (20,100)
 Mogilno (13,000)

Bydgoszcz Voivodeship 1946–1975
Bydgoszcz Voivodeship 1946–1975 was a unit of administrative division and local government in Poland in the years 1946–1975. Initially called the Pomeranian Voivodeship, it was created from the southern part of the pre-war Pomeranian Voivodeship and superseded by the voivodeships of Bydgoszcz, Toruń and Włocławek.
 Capital city: Bydgoszcz
 Area: ?
 Population: ? 
 Urban population: ?
 Population density: ?

List of counties in 1946
 English county name, Polish county name, capital city
 Bydgoszcz City, 
 Toruń City, 
 Brodnica County, Brodnica
 Bydgoszcz County, Bydgoszcz
 Chełmno County, Chełmno
 Chojnice County, Chojnice
 Grudziądz County, Grudziądz
 Inowrocław County, Inowrocław
 Lipno County, Lipno
 Lubawa County, Lubawa
 Nieszawa County, Nieszawa
 Rypin County, Rypin
 Sepolno County, Sepolno Krajenskie
 Świecie County, Świecie
 Szubin County, Szubin
 Toruń County, Toruń
 Tuchola County, Tuchola
 Wąbrzeźno County, Wąbrzeźno
 Włocławek County, Włocławek
 Wyrzysk County, Wyrzysk
New counties established 1946–1975:
 Mogilno County, Mogilno, transferred from Poznań Voivodeship
 Żnin County, Żnin, transferred from Poznań Voivodeship
 Inowrocław City, previously part of Inowrocław County
 Włocławek City, miasto Włoclawek, previously part of Włoclawek County
 Aleksandrów County, Aleksandrów Kujawski, previously part of Nieszawa County
 Radziejów County, Radziejów, previously part of Aleksandrów County
 Golub-Dobrzyń County, Golub-Dobrzyń, previously part of Rypin County
Abolished counties:
 Lubawa County, Lubawa, transferred to Olsztyn Voivodeship
 Nieszawa County, Nieszawa, renamed Aleksandrów County

Former voivodeships of Poland (1945–1975)
Former voivodeships of Poland (1975–1998)